The 2013–14 Bosnia and Herzegovina Football Cup was the nineteenth season of Bosnia and Herzegovina's annual football cup, and a fourteenth season of the unified competition.  The winner would have qualified to the second qualifying round of the 2014–15 UEFA Europa League.

Participating clubs
The following 32 teams competed in Round 1: (Team in bold is the winner)

First round

!colspan="3" align="center"|17 September

|}

Second round

|}

First legs

Second legs

Quarter-finals

First leg

Second leg

Semifinals

First leg

Second leg

Final

First leg

Second leg

References

External links

facebook

Soccerway

SportSport

worldfootball

 
Bosnia and Herzegovina Football Cup seasons
2013–14 in Bosnia and Herzegovina football
2013–14 domestic association football cups